The Champalimaud Foundation is a private biomedical research foundation. It was created according to the will of the late entrepreneur António de Sommer Champalimaud, in 2004. The complete name of the foundation honors the mother and father of the founder and is Fundação Anna de Sommer Champalimaud e Dr. Carlos Montez Champalimaud. It is located in Lisbon, Portugal.

Overview 
The mission of the Foundation is "to develop programmes of advanced biomedical research and provide clinical care of excellence, with a focus on translating pioneering scientific discoveries into solutions which can improve the quality of life of individuals around the world."

The foundation undertakes research in the fields of neuroscience and oncology at the modernistic Champalimaud Centre for the Unknown in Lisbon, opened in 2011. Research into visual impairment is undertaken via an outreach program.

The Champalimaud Clinical Center (CCC) is a modern scientific, medical and technological institution providing specialized clinical treatment for oncology. The Center develops advanced programs for research of diseases. The CCC tries to customize the therapies in order to achieve more effectiveness in controlling and treating the diseases. It was designed by Indian architect Charles Correa.

Management 
The management of the Foundation consists of Board of Directors, General Council, Scientific Committee, Ethics Committee and Vision Award Jury. The acting President is Leonor Beleza appointed by António Champalimaud in his will.

António Champalimaud Vision Award
The award was established in 2007 to recognise contributions to research into vision. In even numbered years it is awarded for contributions to overall vision research and in odd numbered years for contributions to the alleviation of visual problems, primarily in developing countries.

Recipients
Source: Champalimaud Foundation

2018: Jean Bennett, Albert Maguire, Robin Ali, James Bainbridge, Samuel Jacobson, William W. Hauswirth and Michael Redmond
2017: Sightsavers and CBM (Christoffel-Blindenmission)
2016: Christine Holt (University of Cambridge), Carol Mason (Columbia University), John Flanagan (Harvard Medical School) and Carla Shatz (Stanford University)
2015: Kilimanjaro Centre for Community Ophthalmology (KCCO), Seva Foundation and Seva Canada
2014: Napoleone Ferrara, Joan W. Miller, Evangelos S. Gragoudas, Patricia D'Amore, Anthony P. Adamis, George L. King and Lloyd Paul Aiello for the development of Anti-Angiogenic Therapy for Retinal Disease. 
2013: Nepal Netra Jyoty Sangh, Eastern Regional Eye Care Programme, Lumbini Eye Institute and Tilganga Institute of Ophthalmology
2012: David Williams for the application of adaptive optics (AO) to the eye; and James Fujimoto, David Huang, Carmen A. Puliafito, Joel S. Schuman & Eric Swanson for the development of optical coherence tomography (OCT)
2011: African Programme for Onchocerciasis Control
2010: J. Anthony Movshon and William Newsome
2009: Helen Keller International
2008: Jeremy Nathans and King-Wai Yau
2007: Aravind Eye Care System

See also 
 Healthcare in Portugal
 Emergency medical services in Portugal
 List of medicine awards

References

External links 
 

Biomedical research foundations
Foundations based in Portugal
Organisations based in Lisbon
Medical and health organisations based in Portugal